Miguel Villar Alonso (born 19 September 1996), known as Miki Villar or just Miki, is a Spanish professional footballer who plays as a right winger for Polish club Wisła Kraków.

Club career
Born in Nigrán, Pontevedra, Galicia, Miki represented RC Celta de Vigo and Rápido de Bouzas as a youth. He made his senior debut with the latter's first team on 24 November 2013, playing the last 27 minutes of a 1–2 Tercera División home loss against UD Somozas.

Miki scored his first senior goal on 15 December 2013, netting his team's third in a 3–1 away win over Racing Club Villalbés. He became a regular starter in the 2014–15 season, playing in 37 matches and scoring six times.

On 21 July 2015, Miki signed for Segunda División B side Pontevedra CF. The following 1 February, after being rarely used, he extended his contract for a further year and returned to his former side Rápido on loan.

On 24 July 2017, Miki joined CD Boiro in the fourth division, and immediately became a first-choice. On 5 July of the following year, he agreed to a deal with fellow league team SD Compostela, and helped the side in their promotion back to division three 2020.

On 16 June 2021, Miki signed a two-year deal with Segunda División newcomers UD Ibiza. He made his professional debut on 13 August, coming on as a late substitute for Mateusz Bogusz in a 0–0 away draw against Real Zaragoza.

Miki scored his first goal for Ibiza on 7 November 2021, netting the winner in a 1–0 away success over Real Sociedad B. On 23 January 2023, he terminated his contract with the club.

Shortly after, on 27 January, Villar signed with Polish club Wisła Kraków until June 2024, joining his compatriots Ángel Rodado, Sergio Benito, Tachi, David Juncà, Luis Fernández and Álex Mula.

References

External links
 
 
 

1996 births
Living people
Footballers from Nigrán
Spanish footballers
Association football wingers
Segunda División players
Segunda División B players
Tercera División players
Rápido de Bouzas players
Pontevedra CF footballers
CD Boiro footballers
SD Compostela footballers
UD Ibiza players
Wisła Kraków players
Spanish expatriate footballers
Expatriate footballers in Poland
Spanish expatriate sportspeople in Poland